Attorney General Mason may refer to:

Jeremiah Mason (1768–1848), Attorney General of New Hampshire
John Thomson Mason (1765–1824), Attorney General of Maryland
John Y. Mason (1799–1859), Attorney General of the United States
Rex Mason (1885–1975), Attorney-General of New Zealand

See also
General Mason (disambiguation)